Lloyd Raymond Baumgart (January 29, 1908 – July 23, 1985) was an American politician who served as a member of the Wisconsin State Assembly.

Early life and education
Baumgart was born on January 29, 1908, in Green Bay, Wisconsin. Baungart graduated from high school in Powers, Michigan, and went to Green Bay Vocational School.

Career 
He owned a dairy farm, a painting and plumbing business, a hardware store, and a dinner club. He later resided in Lena, Wisconsin, and Coleman, Wisconsin. Baumgart was a Republican member of the Wisconsin State Assembly from 1957 to 1964, and was defeated by Democratic challenger Milton McDougal.

Death 
Baumgart died on July 23, 1985.

References

People from Lena, Wisconsin
People from Marinette County, Wisconsin
Businesspeople from Wisconsin
Farmers from Wisconsin
Republican Party members of the Wisconsin State Assembly
1908 births
1985 deaths
20th-century American businesspeople
20th-century American politicians
People from Green Bay, Wisconsin